Kimberlite tailings are waste materials left after the recovery of diamond from diamond source rock. The material has a particle size ranging from 20 mm to 75 micrometres and can be categorized as a soft aggregate. It contains mainly silica, alumina, iron oxide, and magnesia.

Use of kimberlite tailings

In detergent 
The present invention provides a process for the preparation of detergent builder Zeolite-A from Kimberlite tailing generated as solid waste during diamond mining is disclosed. The process comprises, reacting an acid treated Kimberlite tailing with alkali solution to obtain sodium silicate and reacting it with alkaline aluminum source at room temperature and crystallizing at higher temperature to obtain Zeolite-A. The product is useful as builder in detergent formulation.

In rural roads 
With a view to assessing the potential use of kimberlite tailings in road works, the Central Road Research Institute engaged in a detailed laboratory study. Kimberlite tailings were characterized to determine their physical engineering properties. Results indicate that kimberlite tailings are a marginal material and possess adequate strength for use in the construction of rural roads. The feasibility of utilizing this material for the construction of various layers of road pavement by adopting stabilization techniques was investigated. A study was also undertaken to assess the suitability of this material for use in bituminous mixes. The laboratory studies indicate that kimberlite tailings can be used in subbase and base course layers in a road pavement. They can also be used in bituminous macadam as the base course and in premix carpet as a wearing course. A 1-km-long road was constructed near the diamond mine using kimberlite tailings, and its performance was monitored during a period of 1 full year. The road's performance was found to be satisfactory.

However, since kimberlite is one of the fastest weathering rocks found on the surface of the Earth it is doubtful at best that it could ever be used as a construction material. In fact kimberlite exposed to water or air will alter to serpentine soil with very fine particles extremely fast. Some mines use this characteristic and stockpile kimberlite ore in outside pits and after a couple of years it can then be processed without any crushing hence better preserving the diamonds it contains.

Hydrated amorphous silica 
New process is described for the preparation of free flowing hydrated amorphous silica from kimberlite tailing. The process comprises treating of kimberlite with acid, further reacting it with alkali solution to obtain soluble metal silicate solution, which is subsequently neutralized with mineral acid to polymerize silica as insoluble precipitates. The products is useful in rubber, paints as abrasive etc.

sorption of arsenic from the groundwater 
The experiments were conducted to investigate the sorption of arsenic from the groundwater onto kimberlite tailings in two phases - batch studies and column studies. In batch studies, the effects of different factors such as pH, adsorbent dose and adsorbent size on the performance of kimberlite tailings were investigated. Adsorption kinetics and equilibrium isotherm studies were also carried out. The adsorption capacity of kimberlite tailings was calculated as 0.25 mg/g of adsorbent. In column studies, the performance of fixed-bed kimberlite tailings was studied and the adsorption capacity was found to be 0.27 mg/g of adsorbent. Film diffusion was found to be the rate-limiting factor for the removal of arsenic by kimberlite tailings. Adsorption of arsenic was found to be pH dependent and higher removal efficiencies were observed near neutral pH range. The arsenic uptake increased with increase in adsorbent dose. Spent kimberlite tailings could be regenerated with dilute NaOH. The proposed treatment methodology was applied to the groundwater samples collected from various places of North 24-Parganas district situated in West Bengal, India. The samples were analyzed for the presence of total arsenic. The arsenic contamination of groundwater was found to be location specific in North 24-Parganas district. The maximum arsenic concentration at certain places was found to be many folds more than the WHO recommended limits. The treatment of arsenic contaminated water samples with kimberlite tailings showed 90-94% removal in 12 hours. The present study can be used as a basis for designing and developing filter columns, which can be attached to the tube wells for low cost and effective removal of arsenic.

References

Diamond
Road construction